Mesochora (Greek: Μεσοχώρα, before 1928: Βιτσίστα - Vitsista) is a mountain village in the municipal unit of Pindos in the southwestern part of the Trikala regional unit, Greece. It is located in the Athamanika mountains (southern Pindus), on the upper course of the river Acheloos, about 800 m above sea level. It is situated 40 km west of the city of Trikala. It is located by the Greek National Road 30 (Trikala - Arta). In 2011 Mesochora had a population of 141 for the settlement, and 143 for the community, including the small villages Exochi and Spitia. It became a part of the municipality of Pindos in 1997 under the Capodistrian Plan.

Population

External links
 Mesochora on GTP Travel Pages
 unofficial website

See also

List of settlements in the Trikala regional unit

References

Populated places in Trikala (regional unit)